Truth Hurts or The Truth Hurts may refer to:

Film, television and radio
The Truth Hurts, a 1993 skateboard film from Thrasher magazine
"Truth Hurts", a 2006 episode of McLeod's Daughters
"The Truth Hurts" (Kim Possible), a Kim Possible episode

Music
Truth Hurts (singer) (born 1971), American R&B singer

Albums
The Truth Hurts, a 1994 album by Pro-Pain
The Truth Hurts, a 2000 album by Ed O.G.
The Truth Hurts, a 2021 mixtape by Drakeo the Ruler

Songs
"Truth Hurts" (song), 2017 single by Lizzo that gained popularity in 2019
"Truth Hurts", a song by Deep Purple from their 1990 album Slaves and Masters
"Truth Hurts", a 2001 single by Thirteen:13
"Truth Hurts", a song by Usher from his 2004 album Confessions

Other
The Truth Hurts, a 1985 book by Jimmy Piersall